The Ho Chi Minh City–Trung Luong Expressway (part of the North–South Expressway, labelled as CT.01), is a  highway in Vietnam. This six-lane expressway opened on February 3, 2010, connecting Ho Chi Minh City with Tiền Giang Province and the rest of Mekong Delta. The expressway starts at Tan Tao Interchange, Bình Chánh District, Ho Chi Minh City and ends at Than Cuu Nghia Intersection, Châu Thành District, Tiền Giang.There are four entrances to the expressway.

Traffic

Motorbikes are banned on the highway.

Entrances

References
    

Transport in Ho Chi Minh City
Expressways in Vietnam
Ho